Suncho Corral is a municipality and village in Santiago del Estero in Argentina. It is the capital of the Juan Felipe Ibarra Department.

References

Populated places in Santiago del Estero Province